The 1st BARC Formula 1 Race was a motor race, run to Formula One rules, held on 7 June 1954 as part of the Whitsun Trophy meeting at Goodwood Circuit, West Sussex. The race was run over 5 laps of the circuit and lasted just over 8 minutes, making it one of the shortest scheduled Formula 1 races ever run. It was won by British driver Reg Parnell in a Ferrari 625. Roy Salvadori in a Maserati 250F and Jimmy Somervail in a Cooper T20-Bristol were second and third, with Salvadori setting fastest lap.

Results

References

BARC
BARC Formula 1 Race
BARC Formula 1 Race